Francis Sheed Anderson  (28 February 1897 – 12 September 1966), was a Scottish businessman, civil servant and Liberal Party politician.

Background
He was the son of James Anderson, of Aberdeen. He was educated at Aberdeen Grammar School. He married, in 1921, Helen Forbes Wattie, of Strathdon, Aberdeenshire. They had no children. In 1949, he was awarded a Companion of the Order of the Bath.

World War One
In 1914, he served in the World War I. In 1917, he served in the Indian Army. In 1919, he retired with the rank of captain.

Professional career
In 1920, he became a company director. He became involved as a director with a number of Scottish companies. In 1929, he was a director for Aberdeen Granite Manufacturers, the family business. In 1933, he became President of the Aberdeen Granite Manufacturers Association, serving for three years. In 1940, he became Divisional Food Officer for North East Scotland. In 1943, he became Director of Fish Supplies at the Ministry of Food. In 1946, he became Under Secretary at the Ministry of Food. In 1949, he was appointed Chairman of the International Wheat Council, serving for 10 years. In 1954, he became Executive Director of the International Sugar Council. In 1960, he became Director of the British Sugar Corporation Ltd. In 1964, he became Chairman of the Bacon Market Council.

Political career
In 1929,  he was vice-Chairman of South Aberdeen Liberal Association.
In May 1929, he was selected as Liberal candidate for the West Renfrewshire Division for the 1929 General Election. It was not a promising seat and there had been no Liberal candidate at the previous election.

He did not stand for parliament again. In 1935, he was elected to Aberdeen Town Council, serving for five years. In 1935, he became a justice of the peace for the City of Aberdeen, serving for 18 years. In 1935, he was appointed to the Aberdeen Harbour Board, serving for five years.

External links 
Obituary in The Times

References

1897 births
1966 deaths
Liberal Party (UK) parliamentary candidates